Sorbolo (locally ) is a comune (municipality) in the Province of Parma in the Italian region Emilia-Romagna, located about  northwest of Bologna and about  northeast of Parma.   

Sorbolo borders the following municipalities: Brescello, Gattatico, Mezzani, Parma.

Twin towns
 Viriat, France, since 2000

References

External links
 Official website

Cities and towns in Emilia-Romagna